Maylana Lynn Martin (born April 17, 1978, in Honolulu, Hawaii) is an American former professional women's basketball player and currently a collegiate coach.

Although born in Hawaii, she grew up in Southern California.  She attended Perris High School, where she was a multi-sport athlete, being a four-year letterman in basketball, lettered for three years in volleyball, and lettered for two years on the track team.

Martin attended college at UCLA and graduated in 2000. She began her professional career with the Minnesota Lynx of the Women's National Basketball Association during the 2000 WNBA Draft, and played with the team for two years.

In 2002, the Lynx traded Martin and teammate Erin Buescher to the Charlotte Sting in exchange for Shaunzinski Gortman, the Sting's 9th overall selection in the 2002 WNBA Draft.  However, she was waived by the Sting during their pre-season training camp due to injury.

She began her coaching career as an assistant coach at the University of Portland in 2003.  Beginning with 2004, she served as an assistant coach to her alma mater, UCLA. She went on to coach at Pepperdine from 2008 to 2010.

Now serves as a college basketball analyst for the Pac-12 Network.
Maylana is married to USC Lineman Rome Douglas and the couple has 4 children.

WNBA career statistics

Regular season

|-
| align="left" | 2000
| align="left" | Minnesota
| 30 || 13 || 15.2 || .458 || .263 || .594 || 2.2 || 0.7 || 0.6 || 0.4 || 1.0 || 4.4
|-
| align="left" | 2001
| align="left" | Minnesota
| 31 || 12 || 15.9 || .340 || .333 || .613 || 2.8 || 0.6 || 0.5 || 0.5 || 1.2 || 3.1
|-
| align="left" | Career
| align="left" | 2 years, 1 team
| 61 || 25 || 15.6 ||| .403 || .297 || .603 || 2.5 || 0.7 || 0.6 || 0.5 || 1.1 || 3.7

UCLA statistics
Source

USA Basketball
Martin was named to the USA Basketball Women's Junior National Team (now called the U18 team). The team participated in the third Junior World Championship, held in Chetumal, Mexico in late August and early September 1996. The USA team won their early games easily, but lost by four points to the team from Brazil, ending up with the silver medal for the event.

Martin continued with the team when it was invited to the 1997 FIBA Junior World Championship (now called U19) held in Natal, Brazil. In the opening game against Japan, Martin had a double-double with 24 points and eleven rebounds, leading the team to a win. The next game was against Australia, the defending champion. The USA team pulled out to a 13-point lead in the second half, but gave up the lead and lost the game 80–74. The USA rebounded with a close 92–88 victory over Cuba, helped by 23 points from Martin and Lynn Pride. The USA then went on to beat previously unbeaten Russia. After winning the next two games, the USA faced Australia in the gold medal game. The USA team has a three-point lead late, but the Aussies hit a three-pointer with three seconds left in regulation to force overtime. Although the Aussies scored first, the USA team came back, held on to win 78–74 to earn the gold, and the first medal for a USA team at a Junior World Championship. Martin was the leading scorer for the USA team with 17.9 points per game and the second leading rebounder with 7.0 per game.

References

External links
WNBA Player Profile
UCLA coaching profile

1978 births
Living people
All-American college women's basketball players
American women's basketball coaches
American women's basketball players
Minnesota Lynx draft picks
Minnesota Lynx players
Portland Pilots women's basketball coaches
Power forwards (basketball)
Sportspeople from Honolulu
UCLA Bruins women's basketball players